WBEH-CD (channel 38) is a low-power, Class A television station in Miami, Florida, United States, airing as a Daystar affiliate religious network. The station is owned by the Word of God Fellowship.

History
Launched March 2, 1993, W20BE on channel 20 went defunct within six months. The license was reactivated on September 27, 1995, becoming W20BE once more. What followed was a move to channel 27 as W27BS on January 9, 1997; and an attempt to move to channel 61, which would have made the station W61DD – the same day the change was made in FCC records on July 1, 1999; the calls changed again to W31CD and the station moved to channel 31. On May 31, 2000, W31CD became WPMF-LP, and a year later, WPMF received a class A television license (though its calls retained the -LP suffix). The station received its license to broadcast digitally on January 3, 2014, at which point the call sign changed to WPMF-CD.

WPMF-LP joined Azteca América in November 2002. In 2011, it switched to My Family TV, which became The Family Channel in 2013. On November 1, 2017, WPMF-CD rejoined Azteca América, replacing WGEN-TV (channel 8). The station changed its call sign to WBEH-CD on November 9, 2018.

HC2 Holdings planned to acquire the station from Prime Time Partners in June 2019, along with WSPF-CD. The sale of WBEH-CD would fall through in 2020; in June 2022, Prime Time Partners would sell the station to the Word of God Fellowship, parent of the Daystar Television Network.

Subchannels
The station's digital signal is multiplexed:

References

BEH-CD
Low-power television stations in the United States
Television channels and stations established in 1993
1993 establishments in Florida
BEH-CD
Hispanic and Latino American culture in Miami